Al-Quds-Al-Arabi (English: "Arab Jerusalem") is an independent pan-Arab daily newspaper, published in London since 1989 and owned by Palestinian expatriates. According to news reports in 2013, it is now owned by Qatar media interests, through intermediaries. Its circulation is estimated to be somewhere between 15,000 and 50,000. From the start until his resignation in July 2013, its editor-in-chief was Abdel Bari Atwan, who was born in a Palestinian refugee camp in the Gaza Strip in 1950. After his resignation in July 2013, Atwan was followed by Sana Aloul, a London-based Palestinian journalist.

The paper publishes many Arab writers. It positions itself as an objective newspaper, covering the latest news and events. Al-Quds Al-Arabi states that its "correspondents and writers are biased toward people’s and human rights issues, including women's, children's and refugees' rights. It rejects sectarianism, violence and discrimination". It exposes corruption, violations, racism and practices of oppressive regimes. It advocates for the rights of the Palestinian people and opposes the sanctioned policies of the Israeli occupation. As indicated by its motto, the paper stresses this distinction by emphasizing its independent ownership and viewpoint relative to the other pan-Arab dailies.

History
Al Quds Al Arabi was founded in 1989 and is based in London. The paper first came to global attention after Atwan traveled to Afghanistan in 1996 to interview Osama bin Laden. Like Al-Jazeera, contacts with terrorist groups such as Al-Qa'ida have consistently stirred attention and controversy in the West toward Atwan and the paper, particularly in the immediate aftermath of 9/11.

The fatāwā of Osama bin Laden in 1996 were first published by the paper. On the fifth anniversary of the 9/11 attacks, Atwan wrote: "The events of 11 September will be remembered as the end of the US empire. This is because all empires collapse when they pursue the arrogance of power." However, Atwan explicitly condemned terrorist attacks on innocent Western civilians, as he wrote in one of his two books, The Secret History of al Qa'ida: "I do not endorse or in any way support al-Qa'ida's agenda" and "I utterly condemn the attacks on innocent citizens in the West".

Atwan unexpectedly left the paper as its chairman and editor-in-chief on 10 July 2013 and Sana Aloul became the editor-in-chief. The exact reason for Atwan's sudden departure isn't publicly known, but he stated: "We had on-going and never-ending financial problems whose resolution, ultimately, required political compromises that I was not able to make. Sacrificing professional integrity, our independent editorial line and the space we allowed for free comment were red lines I could not cross."

Organization
The paper is owned and published by  "The Al Quds Al Arabi Foundation for Publishing and Media". The only editor listed on the masthead was editor-in-chief Abd al-Bari Atwan. The newspaper is printed in London, New York City, and Frankfurt, and then circulated in Europe, the Middle East, North Africa, and North America. In addition to London, the paper has offices in Cairo, Rabat, and Amman.

Content
The paper is 20 pages in length. The first half or so of the paper is devoted to political news from around the world, with a focus on what it terms Arab affairs. The paper also has sections devoted to cultural news and other miscellaneous items, as well as business (2 pages) and sports sections (1 page). The paper devotes three pages to op-ed writing, divided into what it calls  "The Al Quds Pulpit" (a forum for reader submission),  "Orbits" (or trends), and  "Opinion". The paper devotes more space to opinion and less space to business news and sports, as compared with competitors like Al-Hayat or Asharq Al-Awsat. Additionally, Abd al-Bari Atwan wrote a well-known opinion column, featured prominently on the front page until his leave on 10 July 2013.

Circulation
Circulation data for Arab media is based on estimates, which vary widely for Al Quds Al Arabi. Former American diplomat and media scholar William Rugh estimated the paper's circulation around 15,000 in 2004 which is also stated by Arab Reform Bulletin. More recent estimates cite significantly higher circulation numbers of around 50,000. By point of comparison, rival London-based Arabic press such as Al-Hayat and Asharq Al-Awsat are generally estimated in the 200,000 to 300,000 range.

Reputation
Marc Lynch of Foreign Policy called Al Quds Al Arabi "the most populist/'rejection camp' of the major Arab papers". It is often paired with Asharq Al Awsat to represent the polar extremes in the pan-Arab press.

References

1989 establishments in the United Kingdom
Arabic-language newspapers
Daily newspapers published in the United Kingdom
Newspapers established in 1989
Newspapers published in London
Newspapers published in the State of Palestine